Stanley Tomkinson (5 June 1907 – 12 August 1969) was a New Zealand cricket umpire. He stood in two Test matches between 1951 and 1955.

See also
 List of Test cricket umpires

References

1907 births
1969 deaths
Sportspeople from Dunedin
New Zealand Test cricket umpires